Superprestigio Dirt Track is an invitational dirt track motorcycle race held at the Palau Sant Jordi in Barcelona, Spain.

History

Established in 1979 by magazine publisher Jaime Alguersuari, Sr.
as Superprestigio Internacional Solo Moto.
Revived in 2014, and headlined by Marc Márquez, 2013, 2014, and 2016 MotoGP Champion and 2012 Moto2 Champion.

The race has been held its new venue,  Palau Sant Jordi, three times: January 11, 2014, December 13, 2014, and December 13, 2015.

Superprestigio Dirt Track IV will be held on December 17, 2016.

The next superprestigio dirt track will append in Paris on 15 dec 2018 at u arena

Results

Superprestigio I, January 11, 2014

Superprestigio Final

Open Final

Superprestigio Superfinal

Superprestigio II, December 13, 2014

Superprestigio Final

Open Final

Superprestigio Superfinal

Superprestigio III, December 12, 2015

Superprestigio Final

Open Final

Superprestigio Superfinal

Superprestigio IV, December 17, 2016

Superprestigio Entry List

Open Class Entry List

Superprestigio Final

Open Final

Superprestigio Superfinal

Superprestigio V, December 16, 2017

Superprestigio Entry List

Open Class Entry List

Superprestigio Superfinal

References

Motorcycle races